China Manned Space Agency is an agency of the People's Republic of China responsible for the administration of China Manned Space Program, the Chinese human spaceflight program.

Name 

The native name of the organization was initially translated into English as China Manned Space Engineering Office (CMESO) as of 2014. However, ever since 2015, the name China Manned Space Agency (CMSA) has been used in official statements and news-releases till date. It is also the name displayed on the official website of China Manned Space Program.

Functions 

China Manned Space Agency represents the Chinese government to take management responsibilities for the China Manned Space Program.

CMSA's functions including development strategy, planning, overall technology, research and production, infrastructure construction, flight missions organization and implementation, utilization and promotion, international cooperation and news-release, etc.

Organizational structure 
CMSA consists of the following divisions:
 Integrated Planning & Management Division
 Scientific Program & Quality Control Division
 Utilization & Development Division
 Infrastructure Construction Division
 System Division

Taikonauts 

As of November 2022, sixteen Chinese taikonauts have traveled to space (in alphabetical order):

Zhang Xiaoguang (张晓光)

International cooperation 

In 2016, United Nations Office for Outer Space Affairs (UNOOSA) and CMSA agreed to increased space cooperation via opportunities on-board China's future space station.

In 2018, UNOOSA and CMSA invited the applications from United Nations Member States to conduct experiments on-board China's Space Station.

On 12 June 2019, UNOOSA and CMSA announced the winners of the selected experiments to be boarded onto the space station.

References

External links 
 China Manned Space website

Space program of the People's Republic of China